The English Reports is a collection of judgments of the higher English courts between 1220 and 1866.

Overview
The reports are a selection of most nominate reports of judgments of the higher English courts between 1220 and 1866. They reproduce many reports not from their original editions but from dependable, although not always verbatim, later editions and give a nominate report citation.

It was published in 178 volumes gradually from 1900 to 1932 by Stevens & Sons in London and by William Green & Sons in Edinburgh.

Citation of these reports
For citation in most Commonwealth countries it is cited in written form as E.R., as in Planché v. Colburn (1831) 131 E.R. 305. Sometimes the original nominate report citation is also used in parallel.

The compendium is sometimes cited in U.S. courts, where it is normally cited by using the original nominate report citation then Eng. Rep., as in Planché v. Colburn, 8 Bing. 14, 131 Eng. Rep. 305 (C.P. 1831).

Index chart

Its 1930 index chart details where each volume of the nominate reports is drawn upon for the 13-category series the work creates. This named each by their most popular title — many bore several and were frequently and variously abbreviated. A full, disambiguatory chart is published by Professional Books.

Series

See also 
 Law report: England and Wales

Further reading
 W. T. S. Daniel, History of the Origin of the Law Reports (London, 1884)
 Index Chart issued for the English Reports, 1930, Stevens & Sons Ltd. (London), W. Green & Son, Ltd. (Edinburgh)
 O. Hood Phillips, A First Book of English Law, 4th ed, 1960, Sweet and Maxwell

References

External links
 Full text of the English Reports on CommonLII
 Search form for the English Reports on CommonLII

 
Legal history of England